Dysons is a bus and coach operator in Victoria, Australia.

History

Dysons was founded in June 1952 when Laurie Dyson purchased the business of Ned Gastin with route 46A Regent station to Janefield Hospital. Over the years a number of routes and businesses were purchased both within Melbourne and in regional Victoria:
 Nathalia to Melbourne from HE Taylor in August 1957
 Kinglake to Melbourne from Heather & Co in 1959
 a 50% shareholding in Northcote Bus Service in 1966, later increased to 100%, operated as a separate brand until January 1982
 Lockington to Melbourne from Harrison, Echuca in 1968
 Barham and Moama to Melbourne from Andersons Coaches, Moama
 Dyson's entered a joint venture with Reservoir Bus Company to form East West Bus Company to operate route 560 Broadmeadows station to Greensborough in August 1980
 Bega to Melbourne was from Gil Toplis in December 1982
 Deniliquin - Moama - Melbourne from Ansett Pioneer in 1987
 Bairnsdale - Lakes Entrance from Lextours, Lakes Entrance in 1987
 Reids Metropolitan Services in December 1991
 Albury - Mildura from Arms & Bell in July 1992
 Sale - Bairnsdale and Bairnsdale - Orbost from Florance, Orbost in January 1994
 Eastern Roadlines, Bairnsdale in January 1994
 In partnership with Reservoir Bus Company, formed Melbourne Bus Link in April 1998 after being awarded a contract to take over provision of services in the western and south-east regions of Melbourne from Met Bus
 Entered a joint venture with Cobb & Co and Sid Fogg's to operate services on behalf of Australian Pacific Tours in 2001 
 Bell Street Bus Company including the Cobb & Co coach business in August 2003
 In 2003 Dyson’s commenced operating services in Alice Springs, sold in May 2012 to Australian Transit Group
 Kyneton Bus Lines in March 2006
 Mylon Motorways, Wodonga in July 2008
 Northern Bus Lines, Glenroy from the Pulitano Group in July 2008 
 Reservoir Bus Company and Midland Tours in November 2012
 Wangaratta Coachlines in July 2014
 O'Connell's Omeo Bus Service in April 2017
 Shepparton Transit/Fallons Bus Service on 1 June 2017 with nine regional bus routes, one V/Line route and 44 vehicles
 The Corowa-Albury Rutherglen operation acquired by from R & L Webster in September 2017
 Bunnaloo Bus Lines in Bunnaloo in January 2018
 McDonald’s Euroa in January 2018
 Wandong Bus & Coach in March 2018
 Purtills, Deniliquin in December 2019 with 55 vehicles
 Little’s Gippsland Coaches, Sale in October 2021 with 28 vehicles

Services
As well as route services in Melbourne, since the late 1970s Dyson have operated services under contract to V/Line. In February 1989, all of Dyson's existing long coach services were integrated into the V/Line network. Dyson operate V/Line services as far afield as Batemans Bay, Canberra, Griffith and Adelaide.

From 2002 until December 2007, Dyson operated a service in New South Wales between Parkes and Condobolin under contract to CountryLink. In January 2015, Dyson commenced operating five-year contracts to operate services for NSW TrainLink from Wagga Wagga to Griffith, Cootamundra to Tumbarumba, Cootamundra to Bathurst/Dubbo and Parkes to Condobolin.

Fleet
As of November 2022, the fleet consisted of 679 buses and coaches. Dyson's official fleet livery is white with green stripes however newer buses which operate route services in Melbourne are painted in the Public Transport Victoria livery. Some coaches are painted in V/Line livery and NSW TrainLink livery.

References

External links

Bus companies of Australia
Bus transport in Melbourne
Transport companies established in 1952
1952 establishments in Australia